Liam Byrne (born 18 August 1999) is an Ireland international rugby league footballer who plays as a  forward for the Wigan Warriors in the Super League.

He has spent time on loan from Wigan at Workington Town in Betfred League 1, and the Leigh Centurions and the Swinton Lions in the Championship.

Background
Byrne was born in Salford, Greater Manchester, England. He is of Irish heritage.

Career
In 2019 he made his Super League début for Wigan against Hull F.C.
On 28 May 2022, Byrne played for Wigan in their 2022 Challenge Cup Final victory over Huddersfield.

References

External links
Wigan Warriors profile
SL profile
Ireland profile

1999 births
Living people
English rugby league players
Ireland national rugby league team players
Leigh Leopards players
Rugby league players from Salford
Rugby league props
Swinton Lions players
Wigan Warriors players
Workington Town players